The 1957 Kentucky Derby was the 83rd running of the Kentucky Derby. The race took place on May 4, 1957.

Of note, future U.S. Racing Hall of Fame inductee John H. Adams finished eighth and his son John R. Adams finished ninth.

The race was unique in that it featured 3 future members of the Hall of Fame: Gallant Man, Round Table, and Bold Ruler. However, none of them won the race. It is considered by many to be the greatest Derby field of all time.

One of the most infamous moments in Derby history also occurred during the 1957 stretch run. Bill Shoemaker, aboard Gallant Man, misjudged the finish, mistaking the 16th pole for the wire. He stood in his saddle for just a second, but it was enough to ruin Gallant Man's momentum and allow Iron Liege to rally up the inside and beat Gallant Man by a nose.

Gallant Man won the Belmont Stakes a few weeks later. Fourth place finisher Bold Ruler won the Preakness Stakes and was the sire of the great Secretariat.

Full results

References

1957
Kentucky Derby
Derby
Kentucky
Kentucky Derby